Tomoxia undulata is a species of beetle in the genus Tomoxia of the family Mordellidae. It was described by Frederick Valentine Melsheimer in 1846.

References

Beetles described in 1846
Tomoxia